Martin Joseph Murphy (1862 – 4 September 1919) was an Irish nationalist politician and Member of Parliament (MP) in the House of Commons of the United Kingdom of Great Britain and Ireland.

He was elected unopposed as an Irish Parliamentary Party MP at East Waterford by-election on 15 February 1913, following the death of the incumbent Irish Parliamentary Party MP, Patrick Joseph Power. He did not contest the 1918 general election.

External links

1862 births
1919 deaths
Members of the Parliament of the United Kingdom for County Waterford constituencies (1801–1922)
UK MPs 1910–1918
Politicians from County Waterford
Irish Parliamentary Party MPs